Fatehpur Assembly constituency may refer to 

 Fatehpur, Himachal Pradesh Assembly constituency
 Fatehpur, Rajasthan Assembly constituency
 Fatehpur, Uttar Pradesh Assembly constituency